DiSalvo or Di Salvo is a surname. Notable people with the surname include:

Antonio Di Salvo (born 1979), Italian-German former footballer
DyAnne DiSalvo, American artist and author
Jason DiSalvo (born 1984), American motorcycle racer
Lino DiSalvo (born 1974), American animator, film director, writer and voice actor
Steve DiSalvo (born 1949), American professional wrestler
Steven DiSalvo (born 1962), American academic administrator
Valter Di Salvo (born 1963), Italian fitness coach formerly with Real Madrid and Manchester United